Sepehran Airlines (Hevapimaii-ye Sepehran) is an airline headquartered in Shiraz, Iran.

History
In April 2015, Routesonline reported that Sepehran Airlines had acquired its first aircraft, a Boeing 737-500, and that it planned to begin flights later in the year. However, the airline did not receive its air operator's certificate until July 2016. Because Iranian civil aviation authorities were concerned about the fleet's age, Sepehran Airlines' initial application for the certificate was denied in June.

Fleet
As of October 2022, the Sepehran Airlines fleet consisted of the following aircraft:

References

External links

Airlines of Iran
Iranian brands
Iranian companies established in 2016
Airlines established in 2016